Vandana Katariya (born 15 April 1992) is an Indian field hockey player. She plays as a forward in the Indian national team. Vandana rose to prominence in 2013, being India's top goal-scorer in the  2013 Women's Hockey Junior World Cup, where India won a bronze medal; she scored five goals in the tournament, the third by any player.

Kataria has played for the senior national team in more than 200 international matches. She was a part of the Indian team that won a bronze medal at the 2014 Asian Games and represented India at the 2016 Rio Olympics. She has cited Argentine Luciana Aymar as her favorite player.

In March 2022, Kataria was awarded the Padma Shri, India's fourth-highest civilian award, in recognition of her distinguished contribution in the field of sports.

Early life
Katariya was born on 15 April 1992, in Roshnabad - Haridwar, Uttar Pradesh (now in Uttarakhand). Her father Nahar Singh works as a master technician in BHEL, Haridwar. Hailing from Roshnabad in Haridwar district, Vandana is one of the most improved players upfront for India in the last couple of years. The youngster first made her junior international debut in 2006 before going on to make her senior international debut four years later. She is from Uttarakhand.

Career
Katariya was picked in the Indian junior team in 2006 and she made it to the senior national team in 2010. She was a part of the team that won bronze at the 2013 Junior World Cup in Mönchengladbach, Germany. She was India's top scorer in the tournament, having scored 5 goals in 4 games.  In an interview she called the bronze medal her favorite moment, "It has to be when we won the bronze medal at the World Cup in Germany. My father was called by the media and he had tears in his eyes. So, making my father proud is the best moment of my hockey career." She won her 100th cap while playing against Canada in 2014 Commonwealth Games in Glasgow, Scotland. "We clearly missed Vandana during the Hawke's Bay Cup. Her being back in the team strengthens our attack as she is good with speed and skill, to break the defence chain, which at times leaves the opponents on the back foot," said Kataria's 21-year-old teammate Poonam Rani. Katariya was honored with Hockey India's Player of the Year Award in 2014. At the Round 2 of the 2014–15 FIH Hockey World League, she finished with 11 goals top-scorer, with India winning the tournament. "In my book, Vandana is one of the top forwards in world hockey. She is quick, can score goals, can defend and is improving all the time,"  Indian women's hockey team's stop-gap coach Roelant Oltmans said after her performance in Round 2 League. In November 2016, Katariya was retained as the skipper of the Indian women's hockey team for the Test Series against Australia and led the team in Melbourne from 23 to 30 November.

After qualifying for 2016 Summer Olympics Katariya said:

The Indian team won a silver at the Asian Champion Trophy, 2018, losing to Korea. Vandana Katariya won the player of the tournament award. Katariya played her 200th match in the third of the five-match series in India's tour of Spain in June 2018 ahead of the World Cup. She was named in the 16-member squad for the  World Cup.

In the 2020 Summer Olympics in Tokyo, Vandana became first Indian woman to score an Olympic hat-trick in hockey. Her family was subjected to casteist slurs after India lost to Argentina in the semifinals. Certain upper-caste men allegedly hurled abuses at Katariya's family saying that the team lost the Olympic semifinal as it had too many Dalit players.

On August 8, 2021, she was appointed the brand ambassador of the centre's 'Beti Bachao, Beti Padhao Andolan'.

References

External links
 Vandana Katariya at Hockey India
 
 
 
 
 
 

1992 births
Living people
Indian female field hockey players
21st-century Indian women
21st-century Indian people
Asian Games medalists in field hockey
Asian Games silver medalists for India
Asian Games bronze medalists for India
Female field hockey forwards
Field hockey players at the 2014 Asian Games
Field hockey players at the 2014 Commonwealth Games
Field hockey players at the 2016 Summer Olympics
Field hockey players at the 2020 Summer Olympics
Field hockey players at the 2018 Asian Games
Field hockey players from Uttarakhand
Medalists at the 2014 Asian Games
Medalists at the 2018 Asian Games
Olympic field hockey players of India
Sportswomen from Uttarakhand
Field hockey players at the 2018 Commonwealth Games
Field hockey players at the 2022 Commonwealth Games
Commonwealth Games bronze medallists for India
Commonwealth Games medallists in field hockey
Recipients of the Arjuna Award
Recipients of the Padma Shri in sports
Medallists at the 2022 Commonwealth Games